Milton Jesús Puerto Oseguera (born 1 January 1969) is a Honduran politician. He currently serves as deputy of the National Congress of Honduras representing the National Party of Honduras for Yoro.

References

1969 births
Living people
People from Yoro Department
Deputies of the National Congress of Honduras
National Party of Honduras politicians
Place of birth missing (living people)
21st-century Honduran politicians